Lost Things is a 2004 Australian suspense film about four friends who go away to the beach for the weekend.

Plot
Four teenagers Emily, Gary, Brad and Tracey, set off for a surfing weekend north of Sydney. But when they arrive at the deserted beach, Emily begins to sense that there is something strange about the place...and soon they all discover that they are not alone.

Cast
 Lenka Kripac as Emily
 Leon Ford as Gary
 Charlie Garber as Brad
 Alex Vaughan as Tracey
 Steve Le Marquand as Zippo

Production
It was shot over 11 days. It was made without government assistance although received support from Showtime.

References

External links
 
 Lost Things at Urban Cinefile

Australian horror films
Australian thriller films
2000s English-language films
2000s Australian films